The black-backed swamphen (Porphyrio indicus) is a species of swamphen occurring from southeast Asia to Sulawesi and Borneo. It used to be considered a subspecies of the purple swamphen, which it resembles, but has a large shield, black upperparts, and the side of the head is blackish.

References 

Transactions of the Linnean Society of London 13: 194.

External links 

black-backed swamphen
Birds of Southeast Asia
black-backed swamphen